Strymon flavaria is a butterfly of the family Lycaenidae. It was described by Ureta in 1956. It is found in Chile.

References

 Eiseliana flavaria in gwannon

flavaria
Lycaenidae of South America
Invertebrates of Chile
Butterflies described in 1956
Endemic fauna of Chile